The civic museums of Forlì - today housed in Corso della Repubblica and elsewhere - are the:

 Musei di San Domenico - headquarters
 Pinacoteca - sited at the former
 Biblioteca
 Collezione Verzocchi
 Collezione Pedriali
 Gipsoteca
 Monetiere Piancastelli
 Museo Archeologico Antonio Santarelli
 Museo Etnografico
 Museo del Risorgimento
 Museo del Teatro
 Museo Ornitologico
 Museo della Ceramica
 Armeria Albicini
 Museo della Ginnastica, housed at the Casa del Balilla during works beginning in 2009

External links 
comune.forli.fo.it
Longer article

Buildings and structures in Forlì
Museums in Emilia-Romagna